Bosnia and Herzegovina competed at the inaugural 7 sports 2018 European Championships from 2 to 12 August 2018. Bosnia and Herzegovina were represented by 8 competitors and competed in 2 sports.

Aquatics

Swimming
A total of 2 swimmers (1 men and 1 women) represented Bosnia and Herzegovina in the swimming events.
Men

Women

Athletics

A total of 6 athletes (all men) represented Bosnia and Herzegovina in the athletics events.
 Men 
 Track and road

Field events

References

External links
 European Championships official site 

2018
Nations at the 2018 European Championships
2018 in Bosnia and Herzegovina sport